Skyvatn is a lake in the northern part of the municipality of Bykle in Agder county, Norway. The lake is located south of the lake Holmavatnet and northwest of the lake Hartevatnet.

The mountains of Storhellernuten, Skyvassnuten, and Sveigen are all located to the northwest, west, and southwest, respectively.

See also
List of lakes in Aust-Agder
List of lakes in Norway

References

Bykle
Lakes of Agder